Orophia haemorrhanta is a species of moth in the family Depressariidae. It was described by Edward Meyrick in 1924 and is known from the Democratic Republic of the Congo.

References

Moths described in 1924
Orophia
Insects of the Democratic Republic of the Congo
Moths of Africa
Endemic fauna of the Democratic Republic of the Congo